
Year 533 (DXXXIII) was a common year starting on Saturday (link will display the full calendar) of the Julian calendar. At the time, it was known as the Year of the Consulship of Iustinianus without colleague (or, less frequently, year 1286 Ab urbe condita). The denomination 533 for this year has been used since the early medieval period, when the Anno Domini calendar era became the prevalent method in Europe for naming years.

Events 
 By place 

 Byzantine Empire 
 Spring – Vandalic War: Anti-Vandal revolt in Tripolitania and Sardinia; Gelimer, king of the Vandals, dispatches the bulk of the Vandal fleet (120 ships and 5,000 men) under his brother Tzazo to Sardinia. Byzantine forces from Cyrenaica occupy Leptis Magna and Tripolis.
 March 25 – In a letter, Emperor Justinian I declares the Bishop of Rome (currently John) to be "head of all Bishops, and the true and effective corrector of heretics."
 Summer – Emperor Justinian I holds a  war council in Constantinople. His advisers warn him against launching an expedition to North Africa, because of the supply-lines (1,000 miles into Vandal waters) and the huge drain on the imperial treasury. Justinian appoints Belisarius to command the Byzantine army.
 June 21 – A Byzantine expeditionary fleet under Belisarius sails in 500 transports, escorted by 92 war vessels (dromons), manned by 20,000 seamen from Constantinople, to attack the Vandals in Africa, via Greece and Sicily. The fleet carries 10,000 infantry, about half Byzantine and half foederati, and 5,000 cavalry, consisting of 3,000 Byzantine horsemen, 1,000 foreign allies (Huns and Heruli) and 1,500 of Belisarius' retainers (bucellarii). On the flagship Belisarius is accompanied by his military secretary Procopius, and his wife Antonina. 
 September – Belisarius arrives at Sicily, which he uses as a staging area, with the permission of the Ostrogoth queen Amalasuntha, daughter of Theodoric the Great and regent of Italy. The Ostrogoths help him with supplies and the fleet is prepared for the final attack.  
 September 9 – The Byzantine army lands at Caput Vada (modern Tunisia). Belisarius marches his army northwards, towards Carthage (over 140 miles), following the coast, accompanied by the fleet and shadowed by Gelimer. During the march, the Vandal towns fall without a fight. 
 September 13 – Battle of Ad Decimum: Gelimer attempts to ambush the Byzantines in a defile at the "10th milestone" from Carthage; due to inadequate coordination and the alertness of Belisarius, the attack is repulsed and the Vandals are scattered into the desert. Belisarius enters the capital and orders his soldiers not to kill or enslave the population. The fleet is stationed in the Lake of Tunis.
 December 15 – Battle of Tricamarum: Gelimer assembles an army of about 50,000 men at Bulla Regia (Numidia), and advances towards Carthage. Belisarius moves out to meet the Vandals; he leads the Byzantine cavalry (5,000 men) into battle. Without waiting for his infantry to come up, he charges, despite odds of almost 10-to-1, and throws Gelimer in confusion. Belisarius captures the Vandal camp by storm. Tzazo is killed in an all-cavalry fight, and Gelimer is forced to seek refuge in the mountains of Tunis with the Berbers.
 December 16 – The Digesta or Pandectae, a collection of jurist writings and other sources, is completed (see Corpus Juris Civilis).

 Europe  
 Theudebert I succeeds his father Theuderic I and becomes king of Austrasia. 

 By topic 

 Religion 
 January 2 – Pope John II becomes the 56th pope of Rome, and the first to adopt a regnal name upon elevation to the papacy (his birth name, Mercurius, being of pagan origin).

Births

Deaths 
 January 13 – Remigius, bishop of Reims 
 Erzhu Zhao, general of Northern Wei
 Fulgentius of Ruspe, bishop (approximate date)
 Hilderic, king of the Vandals and Alans
 Theuderic I, king of Austrasia (or 534)
 Tzazo, brother of Gelimer (killed in battle)

References